Dindicodes is a genus of moths in the family Geometridae.

Species
crocina group
Dindicodes albodavidaria (Xue, 1992)
Dindicodes crocina (Butler, 1880)
Dindicodes davidaria (Poujade, 1895)
Dindicodes euclidiaria (Oberthür, 1913)
Dindicodes leopardinata (Moore, 1868)
Dindicodes moelleri (Warren, 1893)
apicalis group
Dindicodes apicalis (Moore, 1888)
Dindicodes harutai (Yazaki, 1992)
costiflavens group
Dindicodes costiflavens (Wehrli, 1933)
Dindicodes ectoxantha (Wehrli, 1933)
Excluded from Dindicodes
"Dindicodes" vigil (Prout, 1926)

References
 Dindicodes at Markku Savela's Lepidoptera and Some Other Life Forms
 Natural History Museum Lepidoptera genus database

Pseudoterpnini
Geometridae genera
Moths described in 1912
Taxa named by Louis Beethoven Prout